The English School (Helsinki) is a private international school in Helsinki, Finland. It is a bilingual school, so most students can graduate according to Finnish and English school systems in the time students in either country would normally study according to their own system only.

The English School (TES) offers instruction in 2-year preschool/Kindergarten (5-6-years-olds), comprehensive school (classes 1-9) and high school. The curriculum follows the national guidelines, but places a special emphasis on both English and Finnish languages.

The school was founded by Catholic nuns in 1945.

Accreditation and authorization

Accreditation
The English School primarily follows Finnish school system, but students can get international accretion through:
 Grade 9 - International General Certificate of Secondary Education (IGCSE)
 Grade 12 - Finnish Matriculation Examination. In other words, the normal high school ending test in Finland.
 Grade 12 - Scholastic Assessment Test (SAT). This is perhaps the most internationally accepted qualification on this level. In Finland, the Helsinki School of Economics accepts students also on the basis of high SAT scores.
 Grade 12 - Cambridge International Examinations (CIE). CIE qualifications are recognized for admission by UK universities (including Cambridge) as well as universities in the United States, Canada, European Union, Middle East, West Asia, New Zealand, India, Pakistan and around the world.

Structure
The school is divided into following sections:

Preschool
 5 – 6 years old
Most of the students know only their mother tongue: Finnish and do not know any English.
There are tests which measure how ready the child is to enter preschool and about 20% are accepted.
Special emphasis is in teaching English.

Classes 1 - 6
 7 – 12 years old
Preschool and classes 1 - 6 are located in same premises in Mäntytie 14, Helsinki.
A bit over half of the studies are held in English and the rest in Finnish.

Classes 7 - 9
 13 – 15 years old
A bit over half of the studies are held in English and the rest in Finnish.

High school
Classes 7 - 9 and High School are located in same premises which is currently in Valimotie, Helsinki.

Extracurricular activities
In grade 6 students have a field trip to England.
One of the more notable activities is the chess club: in chess the school has been the most successful school in Finland on grades 1 - 9 during 2010 - 2013.

And in 2013, the High School won an English debating tournament.

References

External links

Cambridge schools in Finland
International schools in Finland
Schools in Helsinki
Educational institutions established in 1945
1945 establishments in Finland